README.txt: A Memoir is a 2022 memoir by Chelsea Manning. It covers her early life, experience as a soldier in the U.S. Army, and life and imprisonment after she leaked classified information to WikiLeaks.

In the memoir, she explains that her boss, in late 2009, had recommended a State Department Net-Centric Diplomacy portal with its "trove of diplomatic cables" as possibly "useful to us in our analytical work. I read every single one that related to Iraq, and then began to poke around in the rest of the database..." On February 21, 2010, she leaked "what would become known as the 'Collateral Murder' tape, which showed grainy aerial footage from July 2007 of an Apache helicopter air strike gone horribly wrong."

References

Memoirs of imprisonment
2022 non-fiction books
Military memoirs
Works about whistleblowing
Farrar, Straus and Giroux books